Elbert Norman (February 7, 1897 – October 23, 1962) was an American Negro league shortstop between 1919 and 1926.

A native of Berkley, Virginia, Norman made his Negro leagues debut in 1919 with the Chicago American Giants. He played for the Lincoln Giants the following season, and finished his career in 1926 with the Cleveland Elites. Norman died in New York, New York in 1962 at age 65.

References

External links
 and Baseball-Reference Black Baseball stats and Seamheads

1897 births
1962 deaths
Chicago American Giants players
Cleveland Elites players
Lincoln Giants players
20th-century African-American sportspeople
Burials at Long Island National Cemetery